William Charles Bourne (13 February 1882 – 20 May 1930) was an Australian rules footballer who played with South Melbourne in the Victorian Football League (VFL).

After his brief football career Bourne served at Gallipoli and in France during World War I, suffering a fractured back and being shot in the hand and the hip in an eventful military service period.

Notes

External links 

1882 births
1930 deaths
Australian rules footballers from Victoria (Australia)
Sydney Swans players
Frankston Football Club players
Australian military personnel of World War I